The Fox Islands are a small group of islands in the entrance to Slingsby Channel in the Queen Charlotte Strait region of the Central Coast region of British Columbia, Canada.  Slingsby Channel lies along the north flank of Bramham Island and is one of only two waterways connecting to Seymour Inlet and its side-inlets, which form a maze of inlets within the nearby mainland; the other, on the east side of Bramham, is Schooner Channel (formerly Schooner Passage).

Name origin
The Fox Islands, Slingsby Channel and Bramham Island are all named in association with Bramham Park, the Yorkshire home of George Lane-Fox,

See also
Blunden Harbour

References

Archipelagoes of British Columbia
Central Coast of British Columbia